TVP3 Gorzów Wielkopolski is one of the regional branches of the TVP, Poland's public television broadcaster. It serves the entire Lubusz Voivodeship.

External links 
Official website

Television channels and stations established in 2005
Mass media in Gorzów Wielkopolski
Telewizja Polska